Bahía Basket is a professional Argentine basketball team based in Bahía Blanca, Buenos Aires Province. The club plays in the Liga Nacional de Básquet (LNB), the top division of the Argentine league system as a successor of Estudiantes de Bahía Blanca after the club sold its vacant position in the league.

Bahía Basket's first home venue was Estadio Osvaldo Casanova, rented to its owner, Estudiantes. Since 2020, Bahía Basket venue is the Dow Center, with capacity for 4,000 spectators.

History 
Bahía Basket began as a personal project of former player Pepe Sánchez in an attempt to keep Bahía Blanca's place in the top division of Argentine basketball.

Initially, the main sponsor of the project was the Weber Saint-Gobain Group, which gave assistant in administration issues, as a result, the first name of the team was "Weber Bahía Estudiantes".

One of the first by the committee was to refurbish the Osvaldo Casanova stadium, renovating its surface, grandstands and access. In addition, some players signed with the team, including Pepe Sánchez himself (at 34 years old) and Juan Espil. Other players that came to Bahía Basket were Lucas Faggiano, Pablo Gil, Facundo Giorgi, Ariel Eslava and Facundo Aguerre. 

In June 2013, the Basketball Clubs Association forced Bahía Blanca Estudiantes to change its name, therefore it renamed "Bahía Basket". As the club did not have a venue to host its home games, it rented the Osvaldo Casanova Stadium, property of Estudiantes, to remain in the city. Sebastián Ginóbili was hired as head coach while a bunch of players added to the team. Some of them were Lucio Redivo, Gastón Whelan, Martín Ambrosino, Mateo Gaynor, Lisandro Rasio, Matías Nocedal, Diego Gerbaudo, Ivory Clark James and Nicolás Lauría.

Bahía Basket played a series of preseason games in China, a total of 10 matches there.

In April 2021, Bahía Basket was relegated to the second division, La Liga Argentina, after losing to Atenas 70–60.

Facilities
Bahía Basket venue is the "Dow Center" (named for sponsorship reasons), a modern training center that includes 3 training courts and a stadium for 4,000 spectators. The center also has offices, gym, medical ward, videoconferencing room, and even an art center for players. Down Center was thought to become the main training center in Latin America. Dow Center is a 7,500m2 sustainable building inspired on university campus and training facilities of the United States.

Until the Dow Center was inaugurated, the senior team trained at "Polideportivo Norte", built on abandoned sheds. It is currently used for the youth divisions.

Players

Current roster

Notable players 

  Juan Ignacio Sánchez (2010–13)
  Juan Espil (2010–12)
  Víctor Baldo 
  Hernán Jasen (2012–18)
  Lucio Redivo (2012–17)
  Juan Pablo Vaulet (2014)
  Trevor Gaskins (2014–15)
  Ed Nelson (2010–11)

Retired numbers
As Bahía Basket is recognised as a continuity of Estudiantes in the LNB, the club retired the same numbers than its predecessor. 

Notes

References

External links
 

Basketball teams in Buenos Aires Province
Basketball teams established in 2010